Ptilimnium capillaceum, known by the common name of herbwilliam, is a member of the carrot family, Apiaceae. It is a perennial herb, native to the eastern United States, from Texas to Massachusetts.

References

External links

capillaceum
Flora of the Southeastern United States
Flora of the South-Central United States
Flora of the Northeastern United States
Plants described in 1803
Plants described in 1830